The Second League of the Federation of Bosnia and Herzegovina is a football league in Bosnia and Herzegovina. This level is organized in four different leagues - Sjever (North), Centar (Center), Jug (South) and Zapad (West) (until the season 2011–12 there was two West leagues).

This is the second level of football in Federation and third level of football in the country. Two teams are promoted to the First League of the Federation at the end of the season while bottom teams (depending on league and number of lower leagues) are relegated to the cantonal leagues (see Bosnia and Herzegovina football league system).

2020–21 Member clubs

North (Sjever)
Bosna Kalesija
Bosna Mionica
Dinamo Donja Mahala
Dizdaruša
Gornji Rahić
Gradina
Lokomotiva Miričina
Mladost Malešići
Mramor
Odžak 102
Orahovica 74
Priluk
Prokosovići
Radnički Lukavac
Seona
Svatovac

Center (Centar)
Azot
Borac Jelah
Bosna Visoko
Famos Hrasnica
Ilijaš
Kolina
Krivaja
Mošćanica
Moševac
Natron
Pobjeda Tešanjka
Rudar Breza
SAŠK Napredak
Stupčanica Olovo
Unis
Usora

South (Jug)
Bjelopoljac
Brotnjo
Grude
Kamešnica
Klis
Ljubuški
Neum
Rama
Sloga Gornji Vakuf-Uskoplje
Stolac
Tomislav
Troglav 1918
Turbina

West (Zapad)
Brekovica 78 (II)
Busovača (I)
Iskra (I)
Kiseljak (I)
Krajina Cazin (II)
Krajišnik (II)
NK Novi Travnik (I)
Podgrmeč (II)
Radnik Donji Vakuf (I)
Rudar Han Bila (I)
Rudar Kamengrad (II)
Sloga Bosanska Otoka (II)
FK Vitez (I)
NK Vitez (I)
Vitez Bužim (II)
Vlašić (I)

Winners

External links
Second League North at NSFBIH official website.
Second League Center at NSFBIH official website
Second League South at NSFBIH official website
Second League West at NSFBIH official website.

 
3